The Phyllis Franklin Award is a triennial prize given to an academic by the Modern Language Association.

Notable winners 

Past winners of the prize include:

2016 - Anna Deavere Smith

2013 - John Sayles

2010 - Terry Gross

2007 - Richard J. Franke

2005 - William G. Bowen

2003 - Edward M. Kennedy

References

External links
 

Academic awards